Frampton is a village and civil parish in the Borough of Boston, Lincolnshire, England. The village lies on the edge of one of the great marine creek levees formed during the Bronze Age,  from the modern salt marsh. The population of the civil parish at the 2011 census was 1,299.

The village is one of eighteen parishes which, together with Boston, form the Borough of Boston in the county of Lincolnshire. Local governance of Frampton was reorganised on 1 April 1974, as a result of the Local Government Act 1972. The parish forms its own electoral ward.

Hitherto, the parish had formed part of Boston Rural District, in the Parts of Holland. Holland was one of the three divisions (formally known as parts) of the traditional county of Lincolnshire. Since the Local Government Act of 1888, Holland had been in most respects, a county in itself.

Landmarks
The limestone church of Saint Mary dates from the 12th century and is a Grade I listed building which was restored in 1796 and 1890.

Easthampton has an active bell ringing group based in the old church of St Mary's, holding minor records in this field.

A second church, that of Saint Michael and All Angels, was a private chapel for the Tunnard family who lived at Frampton House. It was built in 1860 by James Fowler, and is a Grade II listed building. Today it is a chapel of ease.

Frampton Hall, a Grade II* listed red-brick country house, was built in 1725 by Coney Tunnard, who was High Sheriff of Lincolnshire.  It is now owned by the Lord Davies of Stamford.

The red-brick Frampton House, is Grade II* listed and was built in 1792 for Thomas Tunnard. It is now a care home. 

Frampton Marsh is a nature reserve which lies to the east of the village, between the outfalls of the River Witham (The Haven), and the River Welland. Part of the marsh belongs to the Lincolnshire Wildlife Trust, the majority being owned by the RSPB and being designated RSPB Frampton Marsh. It is a Ramsar site, and the whole of The Wash area is a designated Special Protection Area.

References

External links

"Peal List for Tower"; Felstead Database Frampton, St. Mary; retrieved 10 April 2011
"The Church in Wyberton and Frampton", Framptonchurch.com Retrieved 25 June 2013

Villages in Lincolnshire
Civil parishes in Lincolnshire
Nature reserves in Lincolnshire
Ramsar sites in England
Borough of Boston